Axl or Axel Smith may refer to:

 Axel Smith (1744–1823), Norwegian topographer
 Axel Smith (chess player) (born 1986), Swedish chess player
  (1856ー1935), Norwegian parliamentary representative
 Axl Smith (born 1984), Finnish former television presenter